The 2018 Uzbekistan Pro League is the 27th since its establishment. The competition started on 6 April 2018 with the match between Norin and Dinamo Samarqand.

Teams

League table

Promotion play-offs 

Mash'al and Istiqlol qualified for 2018 Uzbekistan Super League relegation play-off

See also 
2018 Uzbekistan Super League
2018 Uzbekistan Pro-B League

References

External links 
Uzbekistan Pro League at PFL.uz
Uzbekistan Pro League News

2018
2018 in Uzbekistani football leagues